Garalgachha is a census town in Chanditala II CD Block in Srirampore subdivision in Hooghly district in the state of West Bengal, India.

Etymology
There are three opinions about the name of Garalgachha. One of the popular opinions is 'Garal' means poison. Lord Shiva controlled poison by keeping at his throat. So He was called master of Garal (Garaladhipati). There is a tree (gach in Bengali) by the side of river Saraswati where the symbol of Lord Shiva exists, that tree was called as Garal (poison) gachh (tree). From this name converted the name of Garalgachha of this place.

Geography

Location

Kharsarai, Tisa, Kapashanria, Jaykrishnapur, Purba Tajpur, Begampur, Baksa, Panchghara, Chikrand, Janai, Pairagachha, Naiti, Barijhati, Garalgachha and Krishnapur, all the census towns form a series from the northern part of Chanditala II CD Block to its southern part. The only municipality in the area, Dankuni, located outside the CD Block, occupies the south-east corner of the entire cluster.

Urbanisation
Srirampore subdivision is the most urbanized of the subdivisions in Hooghly district. 73.13% of the population in the subdivision is urban and 26.88% is rural. The subdivision has 6 municipalities and 34 census towns. The municipalities are: Uttarpara Kotrung Municipality, Konnagar Municipality, Serampore Municipality, Baidyabati Municipality, Rishra Municipality and Dankuni Municipality. Amongst the CD Blocks in the subdivision, Uttarapara Serampore (census towns shown in a separate map) had 76% urban population, Chanditala I 42%, Chanditala II 69% and Jangipara 7% (census towns shown in the map above). All places marked in the map are linked in the larger full screen map.

Gram panchayat
Villages and census towns in Garalgachha gram panchayat are: Eklakhi, Garalgachha and Krishnapur

Demographics
As per 2011 Census of India Garalgachha had a total population of 5,411 of which 2,760 (51%) were males and 2,651 (49%) were females. Population below 6 years was 347. The total number of literates in Garalgachha was 4,763 (94.06% of the population over 6 years).

 India census, Garalgachha had a population of 4,499. Males constitute 52% of the population and females 48%. Garalgachha has an average literacy rate of 86%, higher than the national average of 59.5%: male literacy is 89%, and female literacy is 82%. In Garalgachha, 7% of the population is under 6 years of age.

Dankuni Urban Agglomeration
As per the 2011 census, Dankuni Urban Agglomeration includes: Dankuni (M), Purba Tajpur (CT), Kharsarai (CT), Begampur (CT), Chikrand (CT), Pairagachha (CT), Barijhati (CT), Garalgachha (CT), Krishnapur (CT), Baruipara (CT), Borai (CT), Nawapara (CT), Basai (CT), Gangadharpur (CT),  Manirampur (CT), Janai (CT), Kapashanria (CT), Jaykrishnapur (CT), Tisa (CT), Baksa (CT), Panchghara (CT) and Naiti (CT).

Education
Among major high schools in Garalgachha 'Garalgachha High School' (established 1896), 'Garalgachha Girls School' and 'Surabala Vidyapith' come top.

Garalgacha High School is a coeducational higher secondary school at Garalgachha. It has arrangements for teaching Bengali, English, history, philosophy, political science, education,accountancy, business economics & mathematics, mathematics, physics, chemistry and bio-science and computer application.

Garalgacha Balika Vidyalaya is a girls only higher secondary school. It has arrangements for teaching Bengali, English, Sanskrit, history, philosophy, political science, geography, eco-geography, education, nutrition, mathematics, physics, chemistry and bio-science.

Transport 

References

Census towns in Chanditala II CD Block